"Feuerwerk" is a song by German recording artist Wincent Weiss. It was written by Weiss, Sascha Wernicke, Martin Fliegenschmidt, and David Jürgens for his debut studio album Irgendwas gegen die Stille (2017), while production was helmed by the latter. The pop song was released as the album's second single on 13 January 2017 and reached the Top 30 in Germany and Switzerland.

Formats and track listings

Credits and personnel

 Kai Blankenberg – mastering
 Peter "Jem" Seifert – mixing
 Wincent Weiss – vocals

 Sascha Wernicke – backing vocals
 David Jürgens – production, instruments

Charts

Certifications

References

2017 songs